The striped blind snake (Ramphotyphlops lineatus) is a species of snake in the Typhlopidae family. Once claimed as being extinct, it was rediscovered in the Bukit Timah Nature Reserve in Singapore after 172 years. The snake was found dead, and it was 4 cm longer than the previous maximum limit of the snake's length, 48 cm.

References

Ramphotyphlops
Reptiles described in 1839